The Rushmoor Knights American Football Club (formerly Southern Seminoles, Personal Assurance Knights/PA Knights, Farnham Knights) are a British American football club based in Farnham, Surrey.  The Club has three teams; the Farnham Knights (20+), the Farnham Knights U19 (16 - 19) and the Farnham Knights U17 (14 - 17). The Farnham Knights play in the Premiership South of the British American Football Association National Leagues and were the Britbowl champions in 2004.

The team signed former Olympic sprinter Dwain Chambers in 2006

Origins

The Farnham Knights were founded in 1985, under Head Coach Marc Salazar, who was an American service member, serving in the United States Air Force, at RAF Greenham Common. The team played their first friendly in 1985 as the Farnham Knights against the Thames Valley Chargers.  The franchise joined the Budweiser League, Div 1, for the league's inaugural season in 1986 and went on to a successful 5 - 5 season. Their second season, 1987, saw the Knights complete their conference schedule undefeated to win their first Conference title.

During 1994 the Farnham Knights merged with the Hampshire Cavaliers and were renamed the Southern Seminoles.  Personal Assurance stepped in during 1997 to sponsor the side which led to the return of the Knights moniker, the Personal Assurance Knights. In 2007, MH Football Shop took over the main sponsorship of the club, to rename them the Farnham MH Knights.

In 2008, a new main sponsor, Fast Lane, stepped in with a two-year deal. The team were then known as the Farnham Fast Lane Knights.

League Placing and Catchment
As the only club in the Blackwater Valley Farnham Knights has drawn players from across Surrey and Hampshire, within  are Woking, Guildford, Farnborough, Aldershot, Bracknell and Basingstoke.   The club is the only one in the county of Surrey.
 
All games are played at Farnham Rugby Club from 2013, the first season in the club's history that it has been based in the town of Farnham itself after only playing 1 game at Farnham Rugby Club's old ground in Wrecclesham.

Farnham Knights rebranded to the Rushmoor Knights ahead of the 2021 BAFANL season.

Honours
 Budweiser League Div 1 Southern League Champions 1986
 BSL Div 2 Conference Champions 1987
 BNGL National Bowl Runners-Up 1992
 National Passball Champions 1993
 BSL Div 2 Conference Champions 1994
 BYAFA Youth National Runner-up 1994 (1)
 BYAFA Youth National Champions 1996 (1)
 BSL Div 2 Conference Champions 1997
 BYAFA Youth National Runner-up 1998 (1)
 BSL Div 2 National Champions 2000
 BSL Div 2 Conference Champions 2000
 BSL Div 1 National Championship Runners-Up 2002
 EFAF Cup Runners Up 2004
 BSL Div 1 Southern Conference Champions 2004
 BAFL National Championship Winners 2004
 BAFL Div 1 Southern Conference Champions 2005
 BAFL Div 1 National Championship Runners up 2005
 BAFL Div 1 National Championship Winners 2007
 BAFL Youth National Championship Runners up 2007 (1)
 BAFL Youth National Championship Winners 2009 (1)
 BAFANL Youth South West Conference Champions 2013
 BAFANL Juniors Southern Conference Champions 2014
 BAFANL Juniors National Championship Runners up 2014
 BAFANL Southern Football Conference (Division 1) Champions 2015
 BAFANL Oak Bowl SFC Division 1 Play Off Final - Winners 2015
(1) Prior to 2011, the term "Youth" was used for 16 to 19 year olds. Since 2011, Youth is for 14 to 17 year olds and Juniors is for 16 to 19 year olds.

Coaching Records  

Marc Salazar 1985-1988: 26 - 9; .743

References

BAFA National League teams
American football teams in England
Farnham
1984 establishments in England
American football teams established in 1984